Ángela García de Paredes Falla (born 1958) is a Spanish architect. She founded the Paredes Pedrosa studio together with Ignacio García Pedrosa.

Biography

De Paredes was born in Madrid in 1958. She is the daughter of architect  and María Isabel de Falla (the daughter of architect Germán de Falla and sister of composer Manuel de Falla).

De Paredes earned a licentiate as an architect from the Superior Technical School of Architecture of Madrid (ETSAM) in 1983, and an Architecture PhD from the Technical University of Madrid in 2015 with the thesis La arquitectura de José M. García de Paredes, ideario de una obra (The Architecture of José M. García de Paredes, the Ideology of a Work).

Together with architect Ignacio García Pedrosa, De Paredes founded the Paredes Pedrosa studio in 1990. They combine the free practice of the profession with teaching work at the universities of Granada, Barcelona, and Navarra. They are professors of ETSAM's Department of Architectural Projects. They have also held critical sessions at the Harvard Graduate School of Design, ETH Zurich, the Accademia di Architettura di Mendrisio, and the École Polytechnique Fédérale de Lausanne. They have been guest lecturers at the universities of São Paulo, Università Iuav di Venezia, Oslo, Monterrey, Puerto Rico, and Münster, as well as the City University of New York, the Dallas Architecture Forum, the Polytechnic University of Milan, the Technical University of Munich, the Graz University of Technology, and the Times Center of New York.

De Paredes took control of her father's architecture studio upon his death in 1990.

Since 2011, de Paredes has served as a member of the jury for the  Architecture Awards.

Selected projects
 Palace of Assembly of Peñíscola, Castellón, 2000–2003, with Ignacio García Pedrosa
 María Moliner Library, Velilla de San Antonio, Madrid, 2000–2003, with Ignacio García Pedrosa
 Museum of Almería, Almería, 1998–2004, with Ignacio García Pedrosa
 Lecture room at the UAM School of Psychology, University City of Cantoblanco, Madrid, 2002–2004, with Ignacio García Pedrosa
 Teatro Olimpia, Madrid, 1996–2005, with Ignacio García Pedrosa
 146  EMV, Madrid, 2002–2006, with Ignacio García Pedrosa
 Área Arqueológica de la Olmeda, Pedrosa de la Vega, Palencia, 2004–2006, with Ignacio García Pedrosa
 Conservatory of Coimbra, Portugal, 2004 competition, with Ignacio García Pedrosa

Awards and recognitions
In 2007, Ángela García de Paredes and Ignacio García Pedrosa received the Spanish Architecture Award for the Teatro Valle-Inclán in the Lavapiés district of Madrid. In the words of the jury, it was given

In 2013, they received the Eduardo Torroja Award for Engineering and Architecture from the Eduardo Torroja Foundation and the Ministry of Development for the Villa Romana de la Olmeda in Pedrosa de la Vega. The jury cited "the way in which their audacious structural conception, typical of civil engineering, enhances the clear and resounding expression of their architecture."

References

External links

 Paredes Pedrosa studio

1958 births
21st-century Spanish architects
Architects from Madrid
Living people
Spanish women architects
Technical University of Madrid alumni
Academic staff of the Technical University of Madrid